The Mount Charleston Wilderness Area is located west of Las Vegas in the southern part of the state of Nevada in the western United States.  It was created by the U.S. Congress in 1989 under the provisions allowed by the Wilderness Act of 1964, and is managed by both the Bureau of Land Management and the U.S. Forest Service.

Geography

Habitat

 The area also provides the only habitat for the only herd of Rocky Mountain Elk located within Clark County, according to the BLM.
 The area is home to the endangered species, Palmer's Chipmunk, and can often be seen at campsites and trails in the area

Recreation

See also

 Nevada Wilderness Areas
 List of wilderness areas in Nevada

References

External links 
Mt. Charleston Wilderness – Wilderness Connect
Mt. Charleston Wilderness – Humboldt-Toiyabe National Forest
Mt. Charleston Wilderness Fact Sheet – BLM
 National Atlas: Map of Humboldt-Toiyabe National Forest

Charleston Wilderness
Charleston Wilderness
Charleston Wilderness
Charleston Wilderness
Charleston Wilderness